Jurrangelo Cijntje (born May 31, 2003) is a Dutch-born college baseball pitcher for the Mississippi State Bulldogs. He is a switch pitcher, capable of pitching proficiently with both arms.

Amateur career
Cijntje was born in the Netherlands and grew up primarily in Willemstad, Curaçao. He was a member of the Willemstad Little League team that played in the 2016 Little League World Series. Cijntje moved to Miami, Florida when he was 16 years old. He enrolled at Champagnat Catholic School in Hialeah, Florida and committed to play college baseball at Mississippi State University at the start of his senior year. He was selected by the Milwaukee Brewers in the 18th round of the 2022 Major League Baseball draft, but he opted not to sign and enrolled at Mississippi State.

Cijntje entered his freshman season with the Mississippi State Bulldogs as a mid-week starting pitcher. In his first collegiate start against Louisiana–Monroe, he struck out seven batters with one hit and one walk over four innings pitched.

Personal life
Cijntje's father, Michelangelo, played baseball professionally in the Netherlands as a catcher. Cijntje is dominant left-handed.

References

External links

Mississippi State Bulldogs bio

2003 births
Living people
Baseball players from Florida
Baseball pitchers
Mississippi State Bulldogs baseball players
Dutch expatriate baseball players in the United States